The Royal Galleries of Ostend are a seaside neoclassical arcade on a dike on the beach of Ostend, Belgium. They extend from the royal villa in the east to the Hippodrome Wellington horse racing track in the west. The luxury Thermae Palace Hotel sits atop the central section.

History
The Royal Galleries were constructed between 1902 and 1906 following the plans of architect Charles Girault on the orders of King Leopold II of Belgium. They allowed the king and his guests to pass from the royal villa on the beach to the racetrack without being inconvenienced by rain or wind. The galleries show Leopold's attachment to Ostend, his favourite resort, and some charged him with neglecting Brussels, the capital, in favour of Ostend. The king followed the construction closely, personally visiting on February 25, 1905. It was built with the allowance that the city of Ostend received in 1902 as compensation for the ban on gambling. 

There were originally wrought iron grilles between the columns, though these were melted down in the First World War. During the German occupation of Belgium during World War II, the galleries were walled off along their entire length, making them a link in Hitler's Atlantic Wall.

The paintings were a frequent subject of the works of the Ostend symbolist painter Léon Spilliaert.

The Royal Galleries were listed as a protected monument on September 22, 1981.

Architecture
The galleries contain a great number of paired Tuscan order columns, with each pair sharing a bluestone pedestal, and each column has a simple torus at its base. The columns support an entablature composed of a bare architrave, a frieze adorned with triglyphs above each column, and a moulded cornice that projects strongly out of the wall supported by flat rectangular corbels.

References

See also
 Ostend
 Hippodrome Wellington horse racing track
 Charles Girault
 Leopold II of Belgium

Buildings and structures in West Flanders
Buildings and structures completed in 1906
Leopold II of Belgium
1906 establishments in Belgium